Cochlidium is a genus of ferns belonging to the family Polypodiaceae.

The species of this genus are found in America, Africa.

Species

Species:

Cochlidium acrosorum 
Cochlidium attenuatum 
Cochlidium connellii

References

Polypodiaceae
Fern genera